A Girl Who Sees Smells is a 2015 South Korean television series adapted from the KTOON webtoon of the same title by Seo Soo-kyung a/k/a Man Chwi. Starring Park Yoo-chun, Shin Se-kyung, Namgoong Min and Yoon Jin-seo, it aired on SBS on Wednesdays and Thursdays at 21:55 for 16 episodes from April 1 to May 21, 2015.

Its early working title was Sensory Couple, before reverting to the name of the original webtoon. The drama managed to top the Contents Power Index (CPI) rankings for the most influential dramas.

Synopsis
Choi Eun-seol (Shin Se-kyung) arrives home to find her parents murdered. When the murderer is distracted, she escapes but is hit by a car. Eun-seol's parents are later found with a barcode carved into their skin, the work of the "Barcode" serial killer. The lead detective on the case, Oh Jae-pyo (Jung In-gi) realizes that the now-comatose daughter Eun-seol is the sole surviving witness.

On that same night, Choi Moo-gak (Park Yoo-chun) is at the hospital visiting his younger sister (Kim So-hyun), also named Choi Eun-seol, who's being treated for mild injuries after a bus accident. But when he returns to her bed, he finds her dead with her throat slit.

Six months later, Eun-seol comes out of her coma. But she has no memories at all of her life before waking up at the hospital, and her left eye has turned green with no scientific explanation. She has also gained the unique ability to "see" smells as visible colors and shapes, and can even trace where people have been because their lingering scents are like a trail. To protect her, Jae-pyo adopts her and invents a new life for her, telling her that he's her real father and that her name is Oh Cho-rim. Three years and six months pass, and Cho-rim is a cheerful girl who's adjusted to her ability. She dreams of a becoming a comedian, and works as a gofer for a small, struggling theater company called Frog Troupe.

On the other hand, Moo-gak had been so traumatized by his sister's death that after two months of no sleep and constant pain, he'd fainted and was clinically dead for ten days. When he woke up, he'd lost the sense of smell and taste, and is unable to feel pain. And unlike his previous warm personality, Moo-gak is now stoic, emotionless, and speaks in a monotone. He leaves his job at the aquarium to become a police officer, vowing to reopen the case and catch the killer. But to do so, he must first get promoted to detective, and has to prove himself to the head of the homicide unit Detective Kang Hyuk (Lee Won-jong) in ten days or to never ask for a promotion again. Cho-rim also needs a skit partner for her upcoming audition in ten days, and when she offers to help him with his cases in exchange, they decide to team up. After a model (Park Han-byul) turns up dead, seemingly another victim of the Barcode serial killer, Moo-gak joins the investigation headed by Lieutenant Yeom Mi (Yoon Jin-seo), and he zeroes in on two possible suspects: the model's boyfriend, chef Kwon Jae-hee (Namgoong Min) and her doctor (Song Jong-ho).

Cast

Main
 Park Yoo-chun as Detective Choi Moo-gak
After the murder of his sister, Moo-gak is determined to become a police inspector and take revenge for his sister's death. He is desensitised and is unable to smell or taste his food.
 Shin Se-kyung as Oh Cho-rim/Choi Eun-seol
Cho-rim witnessed the murder of her parents and lived on as the sole witness of the barcode serial murders. She has a strange ability-being able to see smells as patterns in the air. She forms a team with Moo-gak, and together, they work to solve the series of barcode murders.
 Namkoong Min as Chef Kwon Jae-hee/Jay Kwon Ford
 Yoon Jin-seo as Yeom Mi

Supporting

 Jung In-gi as Oh Jae-pyo
 Nam Chang-hee as Jo In-bae
 Oh Cho-hee as Eo Woo-ya
 Jung Chan-woo as Wang Ji-bang
 Park Jin-joo as Ma Ae-ri
 Lee Won-jong as Kang Hyuk
 Choi Tae-joon as Ye Sang-gil
 Jo Hee-bong as Ki Choong-do
 Kim Byeong-ok as Chief of Police
 Choi Jae-hwan as Tak Ji-seok
 Jung Hyun-suk as Detective Kim
 Kim Gi-cheon as Kim Joong-in
 Song Jong-ho as Dr. Chun Baek-kyung
 Heo Jung-eun as Ji-eun

Special appearances

 Kim So-hyun as Choi Eun-seol (ep 1–2, 5)
 Kim Dong-kyun as Park Hyung-jin (ep 1)
 Bang Eun-hee as Yang Mi-yeon (ep 1)
 Heo Joon-suk as Kang Sang-moon (ep 1)
 Kim Bo-mi as Convenience store clerk (ep 1)
 Kim Il-joong as himself, TV Entertainment Tonight hosts (ep 1)
 Jang Ye-won as himself, TV Entertainment Tonight hosts (ep 1)
 Running Man cast as Themselves (ep 1)
 Park Han-byul as Joo Ma-ri (ep 2)
 Oh Jung-tae as Autoclub employee (ep 2)
 Park Young-soo as Arrested man at the police station (ep 2)
 Dan-woo as Driver that hit a car in the mountain (ep 2–3)
 Son Se-bin as Driver's girlfriend (ep 2–3)
 Ha Soo-ho as Hwang Ki-soo (ep 4)
 Kim Ho-chang as Tak Min-seok (ep 4)
 --- as Chef Hong (ep 5)
 Oh Tae-kyung as Yang Seok-jin (ep 5)
 Lee Jung-shin as Himself (ep 6)
 Julian Quintart (ep 10)

Ratings

Awards and nominations

Notes

References

External links
  
 
 
 The Girl Who Sees Smells (original webtoon, expired) at kt KTOON
 The Girl Who Sees Smells (English translation, expired) at Tapas
 The Girl Who Sees Smells at Naver Webtoon
 The Girl Who Sees Smells (English translation) at Webtoon

Webtoons
Tapastic webcomics
Seoul Broadcasting System television dramas
2015 South Korean television series debuts
2015 South Korean television series endings
Korean-language television shows
South Korean fantasy television series
South Korean suspense television series
South Korean science fiction television series
South Korean police procedural television series
Television shows based on South Korean webtoons